is a Japanese business executive.

Early life and education
Born in Sasebo, he graduated from that city's Nagasaki Prefectural Sasebo South High School, and then from Tokai University.

Career
After working at National Cash Register Company Japan, Ltd. (Currently known as NCR Japan, Ltd.) and Yokogawa Hewlett-Packard Co., Ltd. (Currently known as Hewlett-Packard Japan, Ltd.), Harada served as a board member of Schlumberger K.K., Board member of Apple Japan, Inc., Vice President of Apple Computer, Inc., (USA), Representative Board and General Manager of Apple Japan, Inc., chairman, President and CEO, Representative Director of McDonald's Company (Japan), Ltd., chairman, President and CEO, Representative Director of McDonald's Holdings Company (Japan), Ltd., Representative Director, chairman and CEO of Benesse Holdings, Inc., chairman, President and CEO of Gong Cha Japan Co., Ltd., and a member of Gong Cha Group Global Senior Leadership Team.

Arrested 
Harada was arrested by Tokyo Metropolitan Police Department due to Domestic Violence with his wife on February 6, 2021. He denies the allegations, the Shibuya Police Station said. On February 24, 2021, he resigned as chairman, President and CEO of Gong Cha Japan "for personal reasons."

Publications
Harada wrote a book, . It was published by Kanki Publishing in 2005.

Personal life
Harada is married to J-pop singer-songwriter Yumi Tanimura.

References

External links 
Kanki Publishing page for Harada's book

1948 births
Apple Inc. executives
Hewlett-Packard people
Japanese chief executives
Living people
McDonald's people
Tokai University alumni
People from Sasebo
Schlumberger people